The 2001 Internationaux de Tennis Feminin Nice was a women's tennis tournament played on indoor hard courts in Nice, France, and was part of Tier II of the 2001 WTA Tour. It was the inaugural edition of the tournament and ran from 12 February until 18 February 2001. Seventh-seeded Amélie Mauresmo won the singles title and earned $90,000 first-prize money.

Finals

Singles

 Amélie Mauresmo defeated  Magdalena Maleeva 6–2, 6–0
 It was Mauresmo's 2nd title of the year and the 5th of her career.

Doubles

 Émilie Loit /  Anne-Gaëlle Sidot defeated  Kimberly Po /  Nathalie Tauziat 1–6, 6–2, 6–0
 It was Loit's only title of the year and the 3rd of her career. It was Sidot's only title of the year and the 2nd of her career.

External links
 ITF tournament edition details
 WTA tournament draws

Internationaux de Tennis Feminin Nice
Internationaux de Tennis Feminin Nice
Internationaux de Tennis Feminin Nice
Internationaux de Tennis Feminin Nice